Jhedli van Briesies (born 15 July 2001) is a South African cricketer. He made his first-class debut on 16 January 2020, for South Western Districts in the 2019–20 CSA 3-Day Provincial Cup. He made his List A debut on 26 January 2020, for South Western Districts in the 2019–20 CSA Provincial One-Day Challenge. In April 2021, he was named in South Western Districts' squad, ahead of the 2021–22 cricket season in South Africa. He made his Twenty20 debut on 26 September 2021, for South Western Districts in the 2021–22 CSA Provincial T20 Knock-Out tournament.

References

External links
 

2001 births
Living people
South African cricketers
South Western Districts cricketers
Place of birth missing (living people)